The 1980 NAIA Men's Ice Hockey Tournament involved eight schools playing in single-elimination bracket to determine the national champion of men's NAIA college ice hockey. The 1980 tournament was the 13th men's ice hockey tournament to be sponsored by the NAIA.   The tournament began on March 1, 1980 and ended with the championship game on March 3, 1980.

Bracket
St. Paul Civic Center, St. Paul, Minnesota

Note: * denotes overtime period(s)

References

External links 
 NAIA ice hockey

Ice
NAIA Men's Ice Hockey Championship
NAIA Ice Hockey Championship
NAIA Ice Hockey Championship